Vicki Mabrey (born April 3, 1956) is an American correspondent for ABC News Nightline.

Career 
Mabrey was a CBS News 60 Minutes II correspondent from 1999 to 2005.  Previously, she worked as a reporter for WBAL-TV in Baltimore, Maryland, for eight years.

Mabrey has received four Emmy Awards: two in 1997 for her reporting on the death of Princess Diana, and two in 1996 for her coverage of the Atlanta Olympic bombing and the crash of TWA Flight 800.

Personal life and education
Mabrey was born in Missouri, which was still segregated at the time, and was one of the first African-American students at her grade school.  She earned a degree in political science from Howard University, in Washington, D.C.

References

External links
 Biography at ABC News website
 

1956 births
Living people
American expatriates in the United Kingdom
African-American women journalists
African-American journalists
American television reporters and correspondents
American women television journalists
Television anchors from Baltimore
ABC News personalities
CBS News people
21st-century African-American people
21st-century African-American women
20th-century African-American people
20th-century African-American women